Barhi is a census town and headquarters of a subdivision in the Barhi CD block in the Barhi subdivision of the Hazaribagh district in the state of Jharkhand, India. It stands at the crossing of NH 19 (old number NH 2)/ Grand Trunk Road and NH 20.. All major buses on the Ranchi-Patna, Ranchi-Gaya, Dhanbad-Patna and Dhanbad-Gaya routes pass through Barhi. Both Tilaiya Dam of DVC and Hazaribagh Wildlife Sanctuary are near Barhi.

History
Barhi was once a subdivisional town (up to 1872). There is a small cemetery on Grand Trunk Road, with a grave of Col Knyvett, Commander of Grand Trunk Road. He died in 1857.

Geography

Location
It has an average elevation of 374 metres (1227 feet).

Area overview
Hazaribagh district is a plateau area and forests occupy around about 45% of the total area. It is a predominantly rural area with 92.34% of the population living in rural areas against 7.66% in the urban areas. There are many census towns in the district, as can be seen in the map alongside. Agriculture is the main occupation of the people but with the extension of coal mines, particularly in the southern part of the district, employment in coal mines is increasing. However, it has to be borne in mind that modern mining operations are highly mechanised. Four operational areas of Central Coalfields are marked on the map. All these areas are spread across partly this district and partly the neighbouring districts.

Note: The map alongside presents some of the notable locations in the district. All places marked in the map are linked in the larger full screen map. Urbanisation data calculated on the basis of census data for CD blocks and may vary a little against unpublished official data.

Civic administration

Police station
Barhi police station serves the Barhi CD block.

CD block HQ
The headquarters of Barhi CD block are located at Barhi.

Demographics
According to the 2011 Census of India, Barhi had a total population of 11,867, of which 6,107 (51%) were males and 5,560 (49%) were females. Population in the age range 0–6 years was 1,755. The total number of literate persons in Barhi was 8,140 (80.50% of the population over 6 years).

 India census, Barhi had a population of 9,933. Males constitute 53% of the population and females 47%. Barhi has an average literacy rate of 60%, higher than the national average of 59.5%; with 62% of the males and 38% of females literate. 18% of the population is under 6 years of age.

Infrastructure
According to the District Census Handbook 2011, Hazaribagh, Barhi covered an area of 3.67 km2. Among the civic amenities, it had 8 km roads with open drains, the protected water supply involved hand pumps, uncovered wells. It had 1,749 domestic electric connections, 62 road light points.  Among the educational facilities it had 10 primary schools, 4 middle schools, 1 secondary school, 1 senior secondary school. It had 1 non-formal education centre (Sarva Shiksha Abhiyan). Among the social, recreational and cultural facilities it had 1 cinema theatre, 1 auditorium/ community hall. Two important communities it manufactured were furniture and shoes. It had the branch offices of 6 nationalised banks, 1 cooperative bank, 1 agricultural credit society.

Education

College
Ram Narayan Yadav Memorial College, a degree college, established at Barhi in 1985, is affiliated to Vinoba Bhave University. It offers courses in arts and commerce.

Schools 

Aryabhatt Pulbic School
Royal Orchid International School
Indian public school
Delhi Public School
DAV public school
Saraswati Shishu Vidya Mandir
Boy's middle school
Ilex public school
S.D.G.M. Academy, konra
ST'S Vinovabhave Public
Little Champ Play School
+2 High School
Girl's Middle School
Little Moon Play School
Nexgan Kids Play School

Transportation
Railway
The 79.7 km long first stage railway project from Koderma to Hazaribagh costing  936 crores was inaugurated by Prime Minister Narendra Modi on 20 February 2015. The railway line passes through the Barhi CD block and there is a station at Barhi.
Roadways 
- Barhi is connected with New Delhi and Kolkata by NH-19 highway and major cities like Ranchi and Patna.

- An international road, Asian Highway 42 (AH42) starts from Barhi to Lanzhou, China connecting India, Nepal & China. It is the nearest Asian Highway to Mount Everest.

Barhi bus station(closed)
A bus station is at barhi but closed after 2011 due to maintenance after focusing of government on it again the work started but due to some reason again station has been closed

References

Cities and towns in Hazaribagh district